The Caseron Marques de Camachos is a mansion located in the village of Librilla, Murcia, southern Spain. Built in the late 16th century, it is a local landmark and major urban architectural currently owned by the descendants of the Marquis de Camacho.

Description 

It is an ancient noble house dating back to 1598, although it has undergone further renovations on its original state. It has a gable roof supported by large wooden beams.  In the interior,  the large kitchen has a large fireplace, typical 18th century furnishings and some family portraits. It has a large wooden carved entrance and two large windows, a veranda with wrought iron railings from the 18th century.

External links 
 https://web.archive.org/web/20110725194848/http://contraclave.org/historia/CONGRESO%20IDENTIDAD/comunicaciones/Fernando%20Barquero%20patrimonio.pdf

 :es:Casa del marqués de Camachos

Buildings and structures in the Region of Murcia
Houses in Spain